Murat Göğebakan (9 October 1968, Adana - 31 July 2014, Istanbul), was a Turkish singer.

Early years 
He was born on October 9, 1968, in Adana. Since his parents were working in Germany, he lived between Adana and Germany until he was 7 years old. he completed his primary, secondary, and high school education in Adana. Then he entered Hacettepe University Ankara State Conservatory in 1986. After completing his university education, he took up work as a lecturer at Çukurova University. During these years, he studied dargah, gave guitar lessons, and worked in a bar. He lived in Adana until 1995.

Career 
Murat Göğebakan, who came to Istanbul in 1995 where he received an album offer from the label Prestij Music of Hilmi Topaloğlu. In 1997, he released his album "Ben Sana Aşık Oldum" from this company. He shot a music video for the songs "Ben Sana Aşık Oldum, Kara Gözlüm, Öyle ki Hasretimsin". Murat Gogebakan was nominated in the categories of "song of the year", "best lyrics", "best composition", "best rock music" and "best newcomer" at the Kral Turkey Music Awards  ceremony organized by Kral TV. He received the Best Breakthrough Male Artist award.

Death 
Göğebakan, who has been treated for cancer (leukemia) for a long time; died in July 2014 in hospital. Göğebakan's body was buried in the Buruk Cemetery in the Sarıçam district of Adana, after the prayer at the Fatih Mosque.

Discography 

 Ben Sana Aşık Oldum (1997)
 Sen Rahatına Bak (1998)
 Tek Suçum Seni Sevmekmiş (1999)
 Merhaba (2000)
 Sindomax (2000)
 Ay yüzlüm (2002)
 Yaralı (2004)
 Aynı Mahallenin Çocukları (2004)
 Sana Olan Aşkım Şahit (2005)
 Geçmişten Geleceğe Yunus Emre (2005)
 Sevgiliye (2007)
 Bahar (2007)
 Aşıklar Yolu (2010)
 Aşkın Gözyaşları (2012)

References

External links 

 Murat Göğebakan Official website
 

Deaths from leukemia
2014 deaths
Hacettepe University Ankara State Conservatory alumni
Anatolian rock musicians
Turkish rock singers
1968 births